Dřenice is a municipality and village in Chrudim District in the Pardubice Region of the Czech Republic. It has about 400 inhabitants.

Notable people
Wilhelm Jerusalem (1854–1923), Austrian philosopher

References

External links

Villages in Chrudim District
Shtetls